Data is uninterpreted information.

Data or DATA may also refer to:

Noun
 Data (word), an article about the English-language word

Arts, entertainment and media
 DATA (band), a techno-pop band created by Georg Kajanus
 Data Records, a record label
 Data (Euclid), a book by Euclid
 Richard "Data" Wang (The Goonies)
 Data (Star Trek), a fictional android in the Star Trek universe

Computing
 Data (computing), any sequence of one or more symbols given meaning by specific act(s) of interpretation
 Data URI scheme, a way to include data in-line in web pages as if they were external resources; it is a form of file literal or here document block

Organizations
 DATA, a non-governmental organization founded by Bono
 Data Design Interactive, infamous shovelware video game developer having ceased operations in 2012
 Design and Technology Academy, a school in San Antonio, Texas, USA
 Draughtsmen's and Allied Technicians' Association, e.g., the Technical, Administrative and Supervisory Section, a defunct British trade union
 Durham Area Transit Authority, the public transit agency serving Durham, North Carolina, USA

Science
 Data (moth), a moth genus
 DATA, one of the diarylpyrimidines class of organic molecules

See also
 Codata (disambiguation)
 Dada (disambiguation)
 Tata (disambiguation)